Gunthwaite and Ingbirchworth is a civil parish in the Barnsley district, in the county of South Yorkshire, England. It contains the hamlet of Gunthwaite and the village of Ingbirchworth. At the 2001 census, the parish had a population of 400, increasing to 460 at the 2011 Census.

See also
Listed buildings in Gunthwaite and Ingbirchworth

References

Civil parishes in South Yorkshire
Metropolitan Borough of Barnsley